Egorov Puginsky Afanasiev & Partners (EPA&P) is an established international law firm in the CIS with offices in Russia, UAE, Ukraine, Belarus, and associated offices in London and Cyprus.

History 
The firm was founded by Nikolai Egorov, Dimitry Afanasiev, and Boris Puginsky in Moscow in 1993, when Western corporations were beginning to expand into the post-Soviet states.

In July 2011, Egorov Puginsky Afanasiev & Partners merged with the international law firm Magisters.

In 2015, firm chairman Afanasiev was awarded "European Managing Partner of the Year" by The Lawyer European Awards.

Locations 
  Moscow, St Petersburg
  Kyiv
  London
  Minsk

See also
 Gorsha Sur

References

External links

1993 establishments in Russia
Law firms established in 1993
Lawyers from Moscow